Malaysian Open can refer to:
Badminton : Malaysia Open (badminton)
Badminton : Malaysia Masters
Darts : Malaysian Open (darts)
Golf : Malaysian Open (golf)
Squash : Malaysian Open Squash Championships
Tennis (men) : Malaysian Open, Kuala Lumpur (tennis)
Tennis (women) : Malaysian Open (tennis)